Syria-News is an online press agency intended to report news about Syria. Their website features several categories of news (domestic, regional, political, and economical) as well as reports and questionnaires that concern Syrian issues. It enables users to comment on most of the news, as well to send contributions; in both cases, they can be published only upon approval.

Syria-News was launched in late 2003, and at that time publishing an online press agency was not straightforward in Syria where most websites featuring political news about Syria were blocked. This gave it a semi-official status, since it was approved by the Syrian government, and the participation of some ministers confirmed this status.

The website has become quite popular in Syria, as an approved portal to discuss domestic issues.

In 2006, the official domain name of their website was hijacked, but soon later retaken.

On February 18, 2008, all Syrian ISPs blocked domestic access to the site and its alternate URL www.news-sy.com. Access was restored by March 6, 2008, though there has been no official statement from the site or Syrian authorities.

See also
Media of Syria
Syrian Arab News Agency

References

External links
Official website

Syrian news websites
Arabic-language websites